Bohu County as the official romanized name, also transliterated from Uyghur as Bagrax County, is a county in the central part of the Xinjiang Uyghur Autonomous Region and is under the administration of the Bayin'gholin Mongol Autonomous Prefecture. According to the 2002 census, it has a population of 60,000.

Name
The area was first populated by Khoshut Mongolians who settled by Bosten Lake. A county was not officially set up until 1971 and was named Bohu, an abbreviation of Bosten Lake

Subdivisions

Towns (镇)
 Bohu (Bagrax) Town (博湖镇 / باغراش بازىرى)
 Bumbut Town (本布图镇 / بۇمبۇت بازىرى)

Townships (乡)
 Bositenghu (Bagrax) Township (博斯腾湖乡 / باغراش يېزىسى)
 Zhagannuo'er (Qakannur) Township (查干诺尔乡 / چاغاننۇر يېزىسى)
 Caikannuo'er (Qekinnur) Township (才坎诺尔乡 / چېكىننۇر يېزىسى)
 Tabanjökin (塔温觉肯乡 / تابانجۆكىن يېزىسى)
 Ulan Jekisin Township (乌兰再格森乡 / ئۇلان جېكىسىن يېزىسى)

XPCC Regiments (Bingtuan / 兵团)
25th Corp (兵团二十五团 / 25-تۇەن مەيدانى)

Demographics

References

County-level divisions of Xinjiang
Bayingolin Mongol Autonomous Prefecture